La Isabel is a district of the Turrialba canton, in the Cartago province of Costa Rica.

History 
La Isabel was created on 4 October 2001 by Ley 8150.

Geography 
La Isabel has an area of  km² and an elevation of  metres.

Demographics 

For the 2011 census, La Isabel had a population of  inhabitants.

Transportation

Road transportation 
The district is covered by the following road routes:
 National Route 415

References 

Districts of Cartago Province
Populated places in Cartago Province